Gregory Alan Tucker (born August 3, 1957) is an American politician and a former Democratic member of the West Virginia Senate, having represented the 11th district from 2010 to 2014.

Education
Tucker earned his BS from West Virginia University and his JD from Capital University Law School.

Elections
2010 Tucker challenged District 11 incumbent Senator Randy White and won the May 11, 2010 Democratic Primary with 6,147 votes (55.6%), and won the three-way November 2, 2010 General election with 14,544 votes (54.4%) against Republican nominee Adam Milligan and Libertarian candidate Thomas Thacker.

2006 Tucker initially challenged District 11 incumbent Democratic Senator White in the three-way 2006 Democratic Primary but lost to Senator White, who was re-elected in the November 7, 2006 General election.

References

External links
Official page at the West Virginia Legislature

Gregory Tucker at Ballotpedia
Gregory A. Tucker at the National Institute on Money in State Politics

1957 births
Living people
Capital University Law School alumni
Democratic Party members of the West Virginia House of Delegates
People from Montgomery, West Virginia
West Virginia lawyers
Democratic Party West Virginia state senators
West Virginia University alumni